Likelihoodist statistics or likelihoodism is an approach to statistics that exclusively or primarily uses the likelihood function. Likelihoodist statistics is a more minor school than the main approaches of Bayesian statistics and frequentist statistics, but has some adherents and applications. The central idea of likelihoodism is the likelihood principle: data are interpreted as evidence, and the strength of the evidence is measured by the likelihood function. Beyond this, there are significant differences within likelihood approaches: "orthodox" likelihoodists consider data only as evidence, and do not use it as the basis of statistical inference, while others make inferences based on likelihood, but without using Bayesian inference or frequentist inference. Likelihoodism is thus criticized for either not providing a basis for belief or action (if it fails to make inferences), or not satisfying the requirements of these other schools.

The likelihood function is also used in Bayesian statistics and frequentist statistics, but they differ in how it is used. Some likelihoodists consider their use of likelihood as an alternative to other approaches, while others consider it complementary and compatible with other approaches; see .

Relation with other theories

Criticism

History 
This built on significant earlier work; see  for a contemporary review.

Likelihood played an important role in Fisher's statistics, but he developed and used many non-likelihood frequentist techniques as well. His late writings, notably , emphasize likelihood more strongly, and can be considered a precursor to a systematic theory of likelihoodism.

See  for early history.

Notable is John Nelder, who declared in :

See also
Akaike information criterion
Foundations of statistics
Likelihood ratio test

References 

 
 
  (With discussion.)

Further reading

External links